Panomtuanlek Hapalang (born November 1, 1966 in Mueang Maha Sarakham) is a Thai Muay Thai fighter. He is former 3 weight Lumpinee and Rajadamnern Stadium champion, he was elected Fighter of the year in 1986.

Biography and career
Panomtuanlek started Muay Thai training with his Uncle and fought in his hometown with the ring name “Anusak Sor Pohpitak”. He caught the attention of Leng Sarakham, a celebrity in the Muay Thai community of Isan, he was transferred to his supervision and also spent time at the Saknipon gym. Leng Sarakham had him fight in many bouts with hundreds of thousand baht on the line. In 1982, Anusak transferred to Hapalang gym in Bangkok and that was when he became Phanomtuanlek Hapalang as widely known by the fans.Panomtuanlek was a dominant clinch and knee fighter of the 80s, he trained alongside other legendary knee fighters Dieselnoi Chor Thanasukarn and Chamuekpet Hapalang.After his fighting career Panomtuanlek became a trainer in Thailand and Japan.

Titles & honours
Rajadamnern Stadium
 1986 Rajadamnern Stadium Super flyweight (115 lbs) champion
 1986 Rajadamnern Stadium Bantamweight (118 lbs) champion

Lumpinee Stadium
 1987 Lumpinee Stadium Super bantamweight (122 lbs) champion (2 defenses)

Awards
 1986 Sports Writers Association of Thailand Fighter of the year

Fight record

|-  bgcolor="#fbb"
| 2000-05-26 || Loss ||align=left| Takashi Ito || MAJKF "COMBAT-2000" || Tokyo, Japan || TKO || 1 || 0:28
|-  bgcolor="#cfc"
| 2000-05-07 || Win||align=left| Takaya Sato || NJKF Millennium Wars 4 || Tokyo, Japan || Decision (Unanimous) || 5 || 3:00
|- style="background:#fbb;"
| 1994-03-04 || Loss ||align=left| Rainbow Sor Prantalay || Lumpinee Stadium ||  Bangkok, Thailand  || TKO (Punches) || 5 ||
|- style="background:#cfc;"
| 1994-02-11 || Win ||align=left| Boonlertlek Sor.Nantana|| Lumpinee Stadium ||  Bangkok, Thailand  || Decision ||5 || 3:00
|- style="background:#fbb;"
| 1991-11-13 || Loss ||align=left| Khunpon Kaewsamrit || Rajadamnern Stadium ||  Bangkok, Thailand  || KO (Punches) || 2 ||

|- style="background:#fbb;"
| 1991-09-23 || Loss ||align=left| Jack Kiatniwat || Rajadamnern Stadium ||  Bangkok, Thailand  || Decision  || 5 || 3:00

|- style="background:#cfc;"
| 1991-08-15 || Win ||align=left| Dechsawin Sor.Vorapin ||Rajadamnern Stadium ||  Bangkok, Thailand  || TKO (Knees)||  ||

|- style="background:#fbb;"
| 1991-06-26 || Loss ||align=left| Taweechai Wor.Preecha || Rajadamnern Stadium ||  Bangkok, Thailand  || KO  || 2 ||

|- style="background:#fbb;"
| 1991-05-13 || Loss ||align=left| Jongrak Lukprabat ||Rajadamnern Stadium ||  Bangkok, Thailand  || TKO (Doctor Stoppage) || 2 ||
|- style="background:#cfc;"
| 1991-03-14 || Win ||align=left| Jongrak Lukprabat ||Rajadamnern Stadium ||  Bangkok, Thailand  || Decision || 5 || 3:00

|- style="background:#cfc;"
| 1991-01-30 || Win ||align=left| Jongrak Lukprabat || Rajadamnern Stadium ||  Bangkok, Thailand  || Decision || 5 || 3:00

|- style="background:#fbb;"
| 1990-11-29 || Loss ||align=left| Prasongphet Sor Tamarangsri ||Rajadamnern Stadium ||  Bangkok, Thailand  || KO || 2 ||
|- style="background:#cfc;"
| 1990-10-31 || Win ||align=left| Khunpon Chor.Rochanachai || Rajadamnern Stadium ||  Bangkok, Thailand  || Decision || 5 || 3:00

|-  style="background:#fbb;"
| 1989-12-31 || Loss ||align=left| Taweechai Wor.Preecha ||  || Bangkok, Thailand || Decision || 5 || 3:00

|-  style="background:#fbb;"
| 1989-11-27 || Loss ||align=left| Phajonchit Lukmatuli ||  || Bangkok, Thailand || Decision || 5 || 3:00

|- style="background:#fbb;"
| 1989-01-15 || Loss ||align=left| Kongnapa Watcharawit || Crocodile Farm ||  Samut Prakan, Thailand  || KO (Punches) || 2 ||
|-
! style=background:white colspan=9 |

|- style="background:#cfc;"
| 1988-12-31 || Win ||align=left| Ruengnoi Chomphuthong ||  ||  Kalasin province, Thailand  || KO || 2 || 

|- style="background:#fbb;"
| 1988-11-25 || Loss ||align=left| Wangchannoi Sor Palangchai || Lumpinee Stadium ||  Bangkok, Thailand  || TKO (Doctor Stoppage) || 2 || 
|-
! style=background:white colspan=9 |
|-  style="background:#fbb;"
| 1988-08-30 || Loss ||align=left| Jaroenthong Kiatbanchong || Lumpinee Stadium || Bangkok, Thailand || Decision || 5 || 3:00
|-  style="background:#cfc;"
| 1988-06-24 || Win ||align=left| Kongtoranee Payakaroon || Lumpinee Stadium || Bangkok, Thailand || Decision || 5 || 3:00
|- style="background:#cfc;"
| 1988-05-03 || Win ||align=left| Namphon Nongkee Pahuyuth || Lumpinee Stadium ||  Bangkok, Thailand  || TKO (Knees)|| 3 || 
|-
! style=background:white colspan=9 |
|-  style="background:#fbb;"
| 1988-01-26 || Loss ||align=left| Samart Payakaroon || Lumpinee Stadium || Bangkok, Thailand || KO (Punches) || 1 ||
|- style="background:#cfc;"
| 1987-11-27 || Win ||align=left| Manasak Sor Ploenchit || Lumpinee Stadium ||  Bangkok, Thailand  || Decision || 5 || 3:00 
|-
! style=background:white colspan=9 |
|- style="background:#cfc;"
| 1987-10-27 || Win ||align=left| Petchdam Lukborai || Lumpinee Stadium ||  Bangkok, Thailand  || Decision || 5 || 3:00 
|-
! style=background:white colspan=9 |
|-  style="background:#fbb;"
| 1987-07-31 || Loss ||align=left| Manasak Sor Ploenchit || || Bangkok, Thailand || KO || 1 ||
|-  style="background:#cfc;"
| 1987-05-19 || Win ||align=left| Samransak Muangsurin || Lumpinee Stadium || Bangkok, Thailand || Decision || 5 || 3:00
|-  style="background:#cfc;"
| 1987-03-06 || Win ||align=left| Samransak Muangsurin || Lumpinee Stadium || Bangkok, Thailand || Decision || 5 || 3:00
|- style="background:#cfc;"
|1986-10-29
|Win
| align="left" | Jampatong Na Nontachai
|Rajadamnern Stadium
|Bangkok, Thailand
|Decision
|5
|3:00
|-
|- style="background:#cfc;"
|1986-09-25
|Win
| align="left" | Jampatong Na Nontachai
|Rajadamnern Stadium
|Bangkok, Thailand
|Decision
|5
|3:00
|-
! colspan="8" style="background:white" |
|-  style="background:#cfc;"
| 1986-08-11 || Win ||align=left| Phisuj Sor.Jitpattana || Rajadamnern Stadium || Bangkok, Thailand || Decision || 5 || 3:00 
|-
! colspan="8" style="background:white" |
|-  style="background:#cfc;"
| 1986-06-12 || Win ||align=left| Boonam Sor.Jarunee || Rajadamnern Stadium || Bangkok, Thailand || KO || 3 ||
|-  style="background:#c5d2ea;"
| 1986-02-13 || Draw ||align=left| Noppachai Lukmingkway || Rajadamnern Stadium || Bangkok, Thailand || Decision || 5 || 3:00
|-
! colspan="8" style="background:white" |
|-  style="background:#cfc;"
| 1985-12-17 || Win ||align=left| Audnoi Lukprabat || Lumpinee Stadium || Bangkok, Thailand || Decision || 5 || 3:00
|-  style="background:#cfc;"
| 1985-10-29 || Win ||align=left| Klaypatapi Majestic || Lumpinee Stadium || Bangkok, Thailand || Decision || 5 || 3:00
|-  style="background:#cfc;"
| 1985-06-04 || Win ||align=left| Panthong Phitaktangluang || Lumpinee Stadium || Bangkok, Thailand || Referee Stoppage || 4 ||
|-  style="background:#cfc;"
| 1985-04-23 || Win ||align=left| Fahlan Lukprabat || Lumpinee Stadium || Bangkok, Thailand || Decision || 5 || 3:00
|-  style="background:#cfc;"
| 1985-03-01 || Win ||align=left| Grandprixnoi Muangchaiyaphum || Lumpinee Stadium || Bangkok, Thailand || Decision || 5 || 3:00
|-  style="background:#cfc;"
| 1985-01-25 || Win ||align=left| Grandprixnoi Muangchaiyaphum|| Lumpinee Stadium || Bangkok, Thailand || Decision || 5 || 3:00
|-  style="background:#cfc;"
| 1985-01-05 || Win ||align=left| Sangchai Singsaphanku|| Lumpinee Stadium || Bangkok, Thailand || Decision || 5 || 3:00

|-  style="background:#cfc;"
| 1984-11-30 || Win||align=left| Kohpho Sitchanyuth || Lumpinee Stadium || Bangkok, Thailand || Decision || 5 || 3:00

|-  style="background:#fbb;"
| 1984-08-31 || Loss ||align=left| Odnoi Lukprabat || Lumpinee Stadium || Bangkok, Thailand || KO || 3 || 

|-  style="background:#fbb;"
| 1984-06-29 || Loss ||align=left| Warunee Sor.Ploenchit || Lumpinee Stadium || Bangkok, Thailand || KO || 2 || 

|-  style="background:#fbb;"
| 1984-03-30 || Loss ||align=left| Dennuah Pitsanurachan || Lumpinee Stadium || Bangkok, Thailand || Decision || 5 || 3:00

|-  style="background:#fbb;"
| 1984-01-24 || Loss ||align=left| Sittichok Monsongkhram || Lumpinee Stadium || Bangkok, Thailand || Decision || 5 || 3:00

|- style="background:#fbb;"
| 1983-11-29 || Loss ||align=left| Sitthichai Monsongkhram || Lumpinee Stadium ||  Bangkok, Thailand  || Decision || 5 || 3:00 

|- style="background:#fbb;"
| 1983-09-10 || Loss ||align=left| Sitthichai Monsongkhram || Lumpinee Stadium ||  Bangkok, Thailand  || Decision || 5 || 3:00 

|- style="background:#cfc;"
| 1983-07-12 || Win ||align=left| Odnoi Lukprabat || Lumpinee Stadium ||  Bangkok, Thailand  || TKO (Knees)|| 3 || 
|-
! style=background:white colspan=9 |

|- style="background:#cfc;"
| 1983-04-07 || Win ||align=left| Banchanoi WichannoiStore || Lumpinee Stadium ||  Bangkok, Thailand  || Decision || 5 || 3:00 

|- style="background:#fbb;"
| 1983-03-07 || Loss ||align=left| Loukrook Kiaturai || Lumpinee Stadium ||  Bangkok, Thailand  || Decision || 5 || 3:00 

|-  style="background:#cfc;"
| 1982- || Win ||align=left| Chanchai Sor Tamarangsri || || Thailand || Decision || 5 || 3:00 
|-
| colspan=9 | Legend:

References

1966 births
Living people
Panomtuanlek Hapalang
Panomtuanlek Hapalang